Melaleucia is a genus of moths of the family Erebidae first described by George Hampson in 1900.

Species
Subgenus Melaleucia Hampson, 1900
Melaleucia uparta Fibiger, 2008
Melaleucia tertia Fibiger, 2008
Melaleucia obliquifasciata (Hampson, 1896)
Subgenus Contrasta Fibiger, 2008
Melaleucia leucomera (Hampson, 1926)

References

Micronoctuini
Noctuoidea genera